Doradillo is a white wine grape grown primarily in the Riverland region of South Australia. It originates from Spain, and is also known as Blanquette of South Australia.

Doradillo is also used as a synonym for the grape varieties Jaén Blanco and Doradilla, but Doradilla is also a distinct variety.

References

Further reading
 
 

Grape varieties of Spain
White wine grape varieties